State Route 24 (SR-24) is a state highway in south central Utah which runs south from Salina through Sevier County then east through Wayne County and north east through Emery County. At a total of 163.294 miles (262.796 km), it is the longest contiguous state route in Utah. A portion of the highway has been designated the Capitol Reef Scenic Byway as part of the Utah Scenic Byways program.

Route description

The highway starts at US-50 near Salina and ends at I-70 near Green River, taking a  scenic route between the Fishlake and Dixie National Forests then through Capitol Reef National Park, along the eastern side of the San Rafael Reef passing Goblin Valley State Park and meeting I-70 again near Green River. Along the way, it passes through the towns of Loa, Lyman, Bicknell, Torrey and Hanksville.

The Mars Society established the Mars Desert Research Station just outside Hanksville, due to its Mars-like terrain .

The north easterly section past the San Rafael Reef is open desert with distant views of the Henry and La Sal Mountains.

Traffic volume

The Average Daily Traffic (AADT) for SR-24 is at its greatest between Salina and Sigurd, where it varies between 3,085 down to 1,500 at the Junction with SR-118.  Past that point, the volume of traffic varies greatly, reaching peaks where the highway coincides with the main streets in the several towns through which it passes.  In Loa, the AADT reaches 2,080, in Torrey, it peaks at 1,230.  Then the traffic dies down to 295 by the time SR-24 arrives back at I-70.

History

The road from SR-11 (by 1926 US-89) at Sigurd southeast and east to Hanksville became a state highway in 1910 (Wayne County) and 1912 (Piute and Sevier Counties). The number was assigned in 1927 by the state legislature, and in 1935 it was extended northeast from Hanksville to US-6 near Green River.

A realignment in 1961 bypassed Capitol Reef Road between Fruita and Caineville; as part of the construction of I-70, the east end was moved west to that highway's exit 149 in 1964. SR-24 was extended north from its west end over former US-89 to present-day US-89 in 1969, and cut back slightly to its current end at US-50 in the 1977 renumbering. (The 1969 extension was signed as part of US-89 until 1992, soon after I-70 was completed.)

For a time in the 1950s and 1960s, there was also a State Route 24A, which was a short spur of SR-24 from Sigurd southwest along Main Street to SR-11/US-89.

Major intersections

References

External links

024
 024
 024
 024
 024
024
Capitol Reef National Park